The Jurca MJ-53 Autan (named after a wind in Southern France) is a plans-built, low-wing, touring monoplane designed in France by Marcel Jurca.

Development

Jurca was initially reluctant to design a side-by-side configuration aircraft as he preferred single-seat or tandem-seat 'fighters', but he was convinced to do it by friends and potential customers.

The Autan is a development of the wooden-construction Jurca MJ-5 Sirocco, with a new trapezoidal wing based on the Jurca MJ-7 Gnatsum, but with flaps. The basic design is for a fixed undercarriage, but it allows for electrically or hydraulically powered retractable gear. For reasons of weight, aerobatics are preferably done only with the fixed gear.

Two prototypes have been built, both with electrically-powered retractable landing gear, and with Lycoming O-360  engines. They made their first flights in 1992.

In 1998 Jurca started studying a four-seat development, the MJ-58, but he was busy with developing the Jurca MJ-70 Gnatsum, and nothing came of it.

Specifications (MJ-53 Autan)

References

External links
 Avions Marcel Jurca website

Homebuilt aircraft
Jurca aircraft
Single-engined tractor aircraft
Low-wing aircraft